Campari is a type of hybrid tomato noted for its juiciness, high sugar level, low acidity, and lack of mealiness. Camparis are deep red and larger than a pear or cherry tomato, but smaller and rounder than common plum tomatoes. They are often sold as "tomato-on-the-vine" (TOV) in supermarkets, a category of tomato that has become increasingly popular over the years. Campari tomatoes can be produced from  different varieties with similar characteristics, the standard being Mountain Magic. As a hybrid, the seeds cost around $150,000 per pound.

The company Mastronardi Produce registered the term "Campari" as a United States trademark for its tomatoes in 2003; however, the trademark was challenged in 2006 based on claims that "Campari" is actually the general name for the tomato variety bred in the 1990s by the Dutch company Enza Zaden.

Characteristics
A typical Campari cultivar is a globe-shaped hybrid with regular leaves, and exhibits resistance to the tobacco mosaic virus. The plant grows , and matures in 70–80 days.

See also
 List of tomato cultivars

References 

Hybrid tomato cultivars